Giorgos Famelis (born 19 August 1967) is a Greek former professional footballer who played as midfielder.

Club career
Famelis started his football career at AO Vouliagmenis and he didn't take long to arouse the interest of the people of AEK Athens, when they attended a match of his club in order to watch his then teammate, Kostas Frantzeskos. In the summer of 1988, he was acquired by the yellow-blacks and he helped the team to a large extent, being a useful tool in the hands of Dušan Bajević for three seasons. He was often the "twelfth player" of the team, won the 1989 championship with AEK. An highlight in his career with AEK was the match on 5 May 1991 scoring a brace in an imposing 2–5 victory over Apollon Athens away from home. During his spell at AEK he won a Championship, a Super Cup and a League Cup.

He left in the summer of 1991 and joined Apollon Athens for a season. He then signed for Panionios, playing in the second division for a season, where they got promoted. In 1995 he moved to the third division side, Panetolikos, where he contributed winning the league in their group and getting their promotion to the second division, in the end of the season. In 1996 he signed for Marko, where he ended his career at the end of the season.

After football
After the end of his career as a footballer, Famelis worked as a scout in Panionios, worked in the small national teams, was a partner of Fernando Santos in Greece. In 2013 he became the General Manager of Asteras Varis. From January 2015, he took over as a scout for the academies of Panathinaikos. In July 2019, he resigned and was added to the scouting team of the academies of Olympiacos.

Honours

AEK Athens 
Alpha Ethniki: 1988–89
Greek Super Cup: 1989
Greek League Cup: 1990

Panetolikos
Gamma Ethniki: 1995–96 (South Group)

References

1967 births
Living people
Super League Greece players
AEK Athens F.C. players
Apollon Smyrnis F.C. players
Panionios F.C. players
Panetolikos F.C. players
Marko F.C. players
Association football midfielders
Footballers from Athens
Greek footballers